Krenz is a surname. Notable people with the surname include:

 Egon Krenz (born 1937), East German politician (SED)
 Eric Krenz (1906–1931), American athlete
 Jacek Krenz (born 1948), Polish academic architect and painter
 Katarzyna Krenz (born 1953), Polish writer, poet and painter

German-language surnames